Kaagaz Ke Phool is a 1959 Indian Hindi-language romantic drama film produced and directed by Guru Dutt, who also played the lead role in the film along with Waheeda Rehman. It is the first Indian film in CinemaScope and the last film officially directed by Dutt. It marked a technical revolution in Indian cinematography and is widely considered to be ahead of its time.

The film was a box office bomb in its time owing to its theme which the masses could not identify with, but was later resurrected as a cult classic in the 1980s. Its failure, both critically and commercially, severely impacted Guru Dutt and brought his studio on the verge of ruins. Dutt never officially directed a film after this. The film's music was composed by S. D. Burman and the lyrics were written by Kaifi Azmi and Shailendra (for one song "Hum Tum Jise Kehta Hai"). Today Kaagaz ke Phool is a part of syllabi in many film schools. It is considered to be the finest self-reflexive film to have ever been made in India.

Synopsis
The film tells, in flashback, the story of Suresh Sinha, a famous film director. His marriage to Veena is on the rocks, due to her wealthy family seeing filmmaking, as a job, lacking in social status. He is also denied access to his daughter, Pammi, who is sent to a private boarding school, in Dehradun.

On a rainy night, Sinha meets a woman, Shanti, and gives her his coat. She comes to the film studio to return the coat, unintentionally disrupting the shooting, by walking in front of the camera. While reviewing the rushes, Sinha recognises her potential as a star and casts her as Paro, in Devdas. Shanti goes on to become a rage and an acclaimed star. Shanti and Suresh, two lonely people, come together. Their liaison is hotly debated in gossip columns and results in Pammi's friends tormenting her, in school. Pammi pleads with Shanti to leave Sinha's life and allow her parents' marriage another chance. Moved by Pammi's plea, Shanti throws away her career and becomes a school teacher in a small village. 

Pammi decides to live with her father, who fights his in-laws in court, but loses custody of Pammi to Veena, who is now his ex-wife. Losing custody of Pammi, along with Shanti's departure from films, drives Suresh to alcohol. This marks the beginning of his downfall, both personally and professionally, in his career and consequent decline in his fortunes. Meanwhile, Shanti is forced to return to films since she has a contract with the studio. Her producer agrees to hire Suresh because of Shanti, but Suresh's self-respect will not let him return and owe his job to Shanti's star status; so she is unable to help him, as he is too far gone for redemption. In the final scene, remembering his glorious past, he dies in the director's chair in an empty film studio, a lonely and forgotten man.

Cast
 Guru Dutt as Suresh Sinha
 Waheeda Rehman as Shanti
 Johnny Walker as Rakesh "Rocky" (Veena's brother)
 Veena as Veena (Suresh Sinha's Wife) 
 Baby Naaz as Pramila Sinha "Pammi" (Suresh Sinha's Daughter) 
 Mahesh Kaul as Rai Bahadur B. P. Verma (Rocky & Veena's Father) 
 Pratima Devi as Mrs. Verma (Rocky & Veena's Mother)
 Minoo Mumtaz as Juliet Singh
 Ruby Myers as Sulochna Devi
 Mehmood
 Mohan Choti
 Tun Tun as Telephone operator

Production
The film is widely considered to be an autobiographical reflection of Guru Dutt's personality, his deepening disillusionment with the film industry and the nature of fame it brings, and on the widely written-about alleged relationship between Dutt and his protégé, Waheeda Rehman. Dutt was married to singer Geeta Roy Chowdhuri (later Geeta Dutt) at the time, and his heavy drinking and the rumours of his passionate romance with Rehman didn't help. Some others believe it to be an homage to Gyan Mukherjee (known for directing Kismet), whom Guru Dutt had joined in 1950. Waheeda Rehman has denied the fact that story was based on Dutt's own life augmenting that Dutt had never tasted failure as all his films were successful at the time of film's production unlike the protagonist who suffered from failure.

V. K. Murthy, a frequent collaborator of Dutt, served as the cinematographer and won the Filmfare Best Cinematographer Award for his work in the film. M. R. Acharekar was the art director and went on to receive the Filmfare Award for Best Art Direction. Bhanu Athaiya, who would later receive an Academy Award for Gandhi (1982), handled the costume design. Ramnord Research Labs, headed by S. V. Rau, did the final film processing.

Soundtrack

The music of the movie was composed by S. D. Burman. He had warned him not to make Kaagaz Ke Phool, which resembled his own life. When Guru Dutt insisted on making the film, S. D. Burman said that that would be his last film with Guru Dutt.

The song Waqt Ne Kiya Kya Haseen Sitam became an evergreen hit and one of the most loved Hindi-film songs of all time. In 2006, it was ranked #3 in the "20 Best Hindi Film Songs Ever" poll of 30 leading music composers, singers, and lyricists. Apart from the song's composition and lyrics, it is also considered one of the best photographed songs of all time. The light-beam effect was produced using two large mirrors and natural sunlight.

Release and reception 
The commercial and critical failure of Kaagaz Ke Phool was an intense disappointment for Guru Dutt. He had invested a great deal of love, money, and energy in this film. All subsequent films from his studio were, thereafter, officially helmed by other directors since Guru Dutt felt that his name is anathema to box office.

In the writing of Sathya Saran's book Ten Years with Guru Dutt: Abrar Alvi’s Journey, Abrar Alvi, who wrote the screenplay and dialogues of Kaagaz Ke Phool, told Saran that he believed the masses just couldn't identify with Suresh's trauma over his personal heartbreak and his lack of professional creative freedom, given that he was reasonably well off and he still had a job, while they struggled to put two meals on their table. He believed viewers couldn't feel for what they saw as the self-indulgent angst of a privileged man.

Home video 

Yash Raj Films released a commemorative DVD of the movie. Included in the special features is a three-part documentary produced by Channel 4 in the United Kingdom on the life and works of Guru Dutt, In Search of Guru Dutt. His close associates and some of his family members remember him, his life and work. There is also a tribute to Geeta Dutt by Lata Mangeshkar, in which she sings "Waqt Ne Kiya Kya Haseen Sitam".

Legacy 
In the 2002 Sight & Sound critics and directors' poll, Kaagaz Ke Phool was ranked #160 in the list of greatest films of all time. It was listed in British Film Institute's Top 20 Indian Films in 2002 at #11; NDTV's listed it in "India's 20 greatest films", citing, "Kaagaz Ke Phool, Guru Dutt's most melancholic film ever, takes his deepening disillusionment with the world and its guardians to a new level of despair. The iconic actor-director plays a filmmaker on the skids. He is unable to get his point of view across to the people who matter and life is a constant struggle, both personally and professionally. The masses failed to connect with the film, but Kaagaz Ke Phool has lived longer than many money-spinners of the golden era of Hindi cinema." It was listed in CNN-IBN's 100 Greatest Indian Films of all time in 2013. It was ranked #6 in Outlook Magazine's poll of the 25 leading Indian directors for Hindi cinema's best films in 2003. It was also listed in Time-Out's "The 100 Best Bollywood Movies" in 2015 at #14.

Kaagaz Ke Phool screenplay was published in 2014 as a book as Kaagaz Ke Phool: The Original Screenplay. In 2019, British Film Institute named Kaagaz Ke Phool as the Best Musical of 1959, citing, “if proof were needed that Guru Dutt was no one-hit-wonder, it's right here.” It was ranked first in The Cinemaholic's list of "Best Hindi Cult Films that were Flops", citing, “The last film officially directed by the legendary Guru Dutt. Often regarded as one of the greatest film ever made, the failure of Kaagaz Ke Phool severely impacted Guru Dutt.” In an article regarding the film, the University of IOWA, summed up, “Flaws and all, Kagaz Ke Phool deserves to rank—with Fellini's 8½—among the all-time great films about filmmaking and life.”

Kaagaz Ke Phool significantly serves the plot of 2022 film Chup: Revenge of the Artist.

Awards 
 Filmfare Best Cinematographer Award – V. K. Murthy
 Filmfare Best Art Direction Award – M. R. Acharekar

References

External links
 
 
 Waqt Ne Kiya – Geeta Dutt
 Opening sequence of Guru Dutt's film Kaagaz Ke Phool, Paper Flowers, 1959
 In-depth analysis of the film at LetstalkaboutBollywood!

1959 films
1959 drama films
1950s Hindi-language films
Indian black-and-white films
Films directed by Guru Dutt
Films with screenplays by Abrar Alvi
Films scored by S. D. Burman
Films about film directors and producers
Films about actors
Films about Bollywood
Films about filmmaking
Films about films
Films about cinematography
Films about screenwriters
Films set in the British Raj
Films set in studio lots
Films set in Mumbai
Films set in Delhi
Films set in Dehradun
Films shot in Mumbai
Self-reflexive films
Films à clef